Bengalis in Pakistan are ethnic Bengali people who had lived in either West Pakistan or East Pakistan prior to 1971 or live in present-day Pakistan. Most Pakistani Bengalis, are bilingual speaking both Urdu and Bengali and are mainly settled in Karachi. Bengalis that arrived in Pakistan before 1971 have now assimilated with the Urdu-speaking people in Karachi.

On the 18th January 2022, Nadra issued CNICs card to Pakistani Bengalis as Pakistani citizens, making them legal Pakistanis.

History

Pre-1947
The founding members of the Pakistani Bengali community were early migrants from East Bengal who arrived in Sindh during the early 20th century. This community of early Bengali settlers assimilated into Pakistani culture and adopted Urdu or became bilingual Bengali speakers.

1947-1971
After Pakistan's independence in 1947, a large influx of Bengalis arrived in Karachi from East Pakistan to West Pakistan. In 1971, some Bengalis opted to return to the newly independent Bangladesh while others opted to remain in Pakistan.

Post-1971
Thousands of East Pakistan Bengalis were living in West Pakistan before the 1971 war and Bangladeshi immigrants arrived in Pakistan right after their war against the same country. These people were Pakistan loving but they were not socially welcomed and still today they are not considered citizens of Pakistan. By 1995, continuous migration of Bangladeshis crossed the 2,500,000 mark. During the administration of Prime Minister Benazir Bhutto, some top advisers became concerned with the large Bangladeshi migrant population, afraid they could become the second largest group in Karachi after Urdu-speaking Muhajir people and disturb sensitive demographics. Accordingly, Bhutto ordered a crackdown and deportation of Bangladeshi immigrants. Benazir Bhutto's action strained and created tensions in Bangladesh–Pakistan relations, with Khaleda Zia, who was in power in Dhaka during the time, refusing to accept the deportees and reportedly sending two planeloads back towards Pakistan and Muslim political parties in Pakistan criticizing Bhutto and dubbing the crackdown as anti-Islamic. She was ultimately forced to abandon the order.

Demographics
According to Shaikh Muhammad Feroze, chairman of the Pakistani Bengali Action Committee, over 200 settlements of Bengali-speaking people exist in Pakistan (mainly in Sindh) of which 132 are in Karachi while other smaller communities exist in Thatta, Badin, Hyderabad, Tando Adam and Lahore. There are numerous Bengali colonies in Karachi, often called "Mini Bangladesh" (or East Pakistan Colony in memorandum), such as Machar Colony, Musa Colony and Chittagong Colony. Colorful Bengali signboards, Bhashani caps, lungis and kurtas are often seen in these areas of Karachi and remain unique. The Chittagong Colony has a bazaar, which is famous throughout Pakistan as the center for Dhaka cloth. In more recent times, the Bengali population has seen a decline as the perilous journey from Bangladesh has been fraught with danger and tense borders. Furthermore, given the tense ethnic rivalries and lack of social welcome in Pakistan, Bengalis have now been traveling elsewhere.

Notable people
 Khwaja Hassan Askari, the last Nawab of Dhaka.
 Muhammad Mahmood Alam, Ace Pilot (flying ace) of Pakistan Air Force most famous for his service and numerous kills in Indo-Pak Wars.
 Khwaja Khairuddin, a Pakistani Politician.
 Khwaja Shahabuddin, a Pakistani Politician & diplomat.
 Alamgir, a popular Pakistani pop singer in the 1970s and 80s, known as founder of pop in Pakistan.
 Hassan Jahangir, famous Pakistani popstar and singer of Hawa Hawa. Born in Karachi to Bengali parents.
 Robin Ghosh, Pakistani music composer and playback singer.
 Shabnam, one of Pakistan's most popular actresses.
 Rahman, one of Pakistan's most popular actors, famously paired with Shabnam.
 Runa Laila, singer who later moved back to Bangladesh.
 Shahnaz Rahmatullah, singer who sang Pakistan's two most popular patriotic songs Jeevay Jeevay Pakistan and Sohni Dharti. Later moved back to Bangladesh.
 Munni Begum, a Pakistani ghazal singer.
 Nurul Amin, a jurist who served as Prime Minister of Pakistan.
 Habibullah Bahar Chowdhury, a politician, journalist and sportsman.
 Roopa Farooki – British writer (half Pakistani, half Bangladeshi)
 Tariq Fatemi, a Pakistani diplomat who serves as the Special Assistant to the Prime Minister of Pakistan on Foreign Affairs, and previously served as Pakistan Ambassador to the United States and to the European Union.
 Zaib-un-Nissa Hamidullah, feminist writer.
 Altaf Husain, a Pakistan Movement activist and founding editor and the first editor-in-chief of Dawn.
 Shaista Suhrawardy Ikramullah, a prominent Pakistani female politician, diplomat and author.
 Shahida Jamil, is a Pakistani lawyer and politician.
 Iskander Mirza, a politician who served as the first President of Pakistan.
 Indu Mitha, is a Pakistani exponent of Bharatnatyam and faculty member at the National College of Arts
 Sir Khawaja Nazimuddin, a conservative Pakistani politician and statesman who served as the 2nd Prime Minister of Pakistan
 Sir Abdur Rahim, jurist and Islamic author who participated in the Pakistan Movement
 Jalaludin Abdur Rahim, Nietzschean philosopher and one of the founders of the influential Pakistan People's Party
 Hamoodur Rahman, a jurist who served as the Chief Justice of Pakistan.
 Najma Sadeque, journalist, author, and women's rights activist.
 Ikram Sehgal, Defence analyst.
 Huseyn Shaheed Suhrawardy, a politician who served as Prime Minister of Pakistan.
 Hasan Shaheed Suhrawardy, polyglot scholar and diplomat, brother of the former.
 Begum Akhtar Sulaiman, Pakistani social worker, political activist and the daughter of Huseyn Shaheed Suhrawardy.

See also
 List of Pakistani Bengali films
 Musa Colony
 Daily Qaumi Bandhan
 Machar Colony
 Chittagong Colony
 Rohingya people in Pakistan
 Stranded Pakistanis in Bangladesh

References

Further reading
 You Can't Get There From Here: Bengali immigrants in Pakistan now wish they'd never left Bangladesh
 Bengali immigrants in Karachi polarised over violence in Bangladesh
 Bengalis afraid of losing their identity and rights
 The Bengal Borderland: Beyond State and Nation in South Asia
 Too many mouths to feed in Karachi's slum fishermen's colony
 In Search of an Identity
 
 No CNICs for Pakistani Bengalis means no jobs for them
 
 Bangladeshi migrants struggle in Karachi slum

External links
 Bangladeshi students association of Pakistan

 
 
Ethnic groups in Pakistan
Pakistan
Immigration to Pakistan
Muhajir communities
Refugees in Pakistan